Andranik (is a given name to Armenian males. In Armenian, it means "first-born child in the family".

With the addition of -yan or -ian ( it becomes a common Armenian family name.

People 
Andranik and its variant pronunciations Antranig / Antranik may refer to:

Andranik
 Andranik Eskandarian (born 1951), Iranian American football (soccer) player
 Andranik Hakobyan (boxer) (born 1981), Armenian boxer
 Andranik Madadian (born 1959), better known by his stage name, Andy, Armenian-Iranian singer-songwriter
 Andranik Margaryan (1951–2007), Armenian politician, Prime Minister of Armenia (2000–2007)
 Andranik Ozanian, also known as General Andranik (Zōravar Andranik), an Armenian general (1865–1927)
 Andranik Teymourian, an Iranian football player

Antranig
 Antranig Chalabian (1922–2011), medical illustrator, cartographer and historian
 Antranig Dzarugian (1913–1989), Armenian diasporan Armenian writer, poet, educator and journalist

Sports 
 Antranik Youth Association,  Lebanese-Armenian multi-sports and cultural club

Others 
 Andranikological Review, an Armenian youth historical half-yearly periodical published in Yerevan, in 2002–2004

See also

References 

Armenian masculine given names